Bishan railway station is a railway station of Chengdu–Chongqing intercity railway located in Qinggang Subdistrict, Bishan District, Chongqing, China. Construction began on 29 December 2013. It was opened on 26 December 2015 which brought an end to the time when Bishan District had no rail transport system or a comprehensive transfer hub.

The transport hub covers an area of 150 acres and cost approximately 530 million yuan. It functions as a transfer hub for long-distance coaches, buses, taxis and private vehicles.

Connections
The railway station is connected to the southern terminus of the Bishan rubber-tyred tram.

References

Stations on the Chengdu–Chongqing Intercity Railway
Railway stations in China opened in 2015